Doreen Cannon (21 October 1930-18 September 1995) was born and raised in New York City. She trained as an actress at the HB Studio in Manhattan for over 10 years with Uta Hagen and Herbert Berghof. Her contemporaries included Peter Falk, Geraldine Page, Sandy Dennis, Maureen Stapleton, Anne Meara and Jerry Stiller. She appeared in many plays off Broadway and in Summer Stock alongside such stars as Dorothy Lamour, Robert Alda, Alan Alda and Basil Rathbone. She married an English Property Developer David Cannon in NYC and came over to London in 1959. She was subsequently invited by George Devine to teach master workshops at The Royal Court Theatre.

She was one of the first practitioners to bring over the Stanislavski technique - method acting from the USA. Subsequently, she was invited to be Head of Acting at Drama Centre London in 1963. This was the first "Method" school to open in the United Kingdom. She taught and directed there for 20 years and was responsible for training such actors as: Pierce Brosnan, Colin Firth, Geraldine James, Frances de la Tour, Penelope Wilton, Garry Cooper and Simon Callow, who wrote about his training with Doreen in his book "Being an actor". She formed her own theatre company in the 1970s Theatre 84 which was one of the first fringe companies in London. In 1978 she was asked to head teaching acting for Adam Darius Mime School in London.

Cannon also ran her own acting workshops and gave acting classes; members included Jennie Buckman Ann Penningtton, Emma Relph , Angelique Rockas , Annabel Brooks 

In 1983 Cannon was invited to become Head of Acting at The Royal Academy of Dramatic Art (RADA). 

This marked a major shift in the training at RADA and after 80 years this was the first time they decided to embrace the Stanislavski technique - Method as taught by Doreen Cannon. At the Royal Academy of Dramatic Art she trained such actors as: Michael Sheen, Adrian Lester, Indira Varma, Matthew Macfadyen and Ioan Gruffudd. As well as being known for teaching acting technique at these drama schools, she was invited to guest teach and direct in Sweden at Göteborg Teaterhögskolan i Göteborg and Teaterhögskolan Malmö, which she did for more than two decades. Cannon's views on acting were published in a book Masters of the Stage. She also conducted various master classes and was a guest teacher at the HB Studio in New York City. Her daughter, Dee Cannon, followed in her footsteps, as a respected acting coach.

Doreen Cannon died on 18 September 1995.
Doreen`s mantle has now been taken up by her daughter Dee Cannon as an expositor of her mother`s acting method .

References

External links
 Dee Cannon's Official Website
 

1930 births
1995 deaths
20th-century American actresses
Actresses from New York City